Christian Dibble (born 11 May 1994) is a Welsh professional footballer who plays as a goalkeeper for Kidderminster Harriers.

Early and personal life
Dibble was born in Wilmslow, England. His father is Welsh former footballer Andy Dibble who played for Manchester City. The Dibble family are all Manchester City supporters.

Club career
Dibble has played for Bury, Barnsley, Stockport County, Nuneaton Town, Chelmsford City, Boston United, Chorley and Wrexham.

Throughout his Wrexham career Dibble has served as backup to first-choice goalkeeper Rob Lainton, speaking about it in July 2018, January 2019, April 2019, and again in April 2021.

In August 2019 he was said by local media to have "impressed after being handed starting role", and in October 2021 he was praised by Wrexham manager Phil Parkinson after appearing as a substitute after 13 minutes in a match, following a head injury to Lainton.

In April 2022, he spoke about Wrexham's support. In May 2022 he played for Wrexham in the 2022 FA Trophy Final having appeared in the competition following further injury to Lainton.

He left Wrexham by mutual consent in January 2023. He signed for Kidderminster Harriers on 27 January 2023.

International career
Dibble has played for Wales at youth level up to and including under-21.

Honours
Wrexham
FA Trophy runner-up: 2021–22

References

1994 births
Living people
English footballers
Welsh footballers
Wales youth international footballers
Wales under-21 international footballers
Bury F.C. players
Barnsley F.C. players
Stockport County F.C. players
Nuneaton Borough F.C. players
Chelmsford City F.C. players
Boston United F.C. players
Chorley F.C. players
Wrexham A.F.C. players
Kidderminster Harriers F.C. players
National League (English football) players
Association football goalkeepers